Joshua Leo Youngblood (born January 26, 2001) is an American football wide receiver and kick returner for the Rutgers Scarlet Knights. He previously played at Kansas State.

Early life and high school career
Youngblood grew up in Tampa, Florida and attended Berkeley Preparatory School, where he played wide receiver until moving to quarterback before his junior year. He passed for 672 yards and eight touchdowns while rushing for 855 yards and 11 touchdowns. As a senior, Youngblood rushed 1,326 yards and 15 touchdowns on 206 carries while throwing for 384 yards and five touchdowns and catching one pass for a 73-yard touchdown. Youngblood initially committed to play college football at Temple, but later changed his commitment to Kansas State over offers from Boston College, Air Force and Navy, who recruited him to play quarterback.

College career

Kansas State 
As a true freshman, Youngblood served as the Wildcats' primary kick returner and returned 13 kickoffs for 495 yards and three touchdowns and was named first team All-Big 12 Conference and the conference Special Teams Player of the Year. He also caught nine passes for 73 yards and rushed 11 times for 55 yards and a touchdown on offense. Youngblood was named a preseason All-American by Phil Steele, ESPN and CBS Sports entering his sophomore season. After appearing in only two of Kansas State's first four games and recording no receptions, Youngblood entered the transfer portal.

Rutgers 
Youngblood announced that he would be transferring to Rutgers in November, 2020.

References

External links
Kansas State Wildcats bio
Rutgers Scarlet Knights bio

2001 births
Living people
Players of American football from Tampa, Florida
American football wide receivers
Kansas State Wildcats football players
Rutgers Scarlet Knights football players